This was the first edition of the tournament, primarily organised due to the cancellation of many tournaments in 2020, due to the COVID-19 pandemic.

Pierre-Hugues Herbert and Nicolas Mahut won the title, defeating Łukasz Kubot and Marcelo Melo in the final, 6–4, 6–4.

Seeds

Draw

Draw

References

External links
Main draw

Bett1Hulks Indoors - Doubles